Constantine Harmenopoulos (1320 – ) was a Byzantine jurist from Greece who held the post of katholikos kritēs ("universal judge") of Thessalonica, one of the highest judicial offices in the Byzantine Empire.

He is best known for his Hexabiblos (1344–1345), a law book in six volumes in which he compiles a wide range of Byzantine legal sources. First printed 1540 in Paris, the Hexabiblos was widely adopted in the Balkans under the Ottoman Empire. In 1828, it was also adopted as the interim civil code in the newly independent Greek state.

References
 
 Foundation of the Hellenic World, History of the late Byzantine Period, The Hexabiblos, accessed January 2007

External links
Manuale legum sive Hexabiblos cum appendicibus et legibus agrariis, Gustav Ernst Heimbach (ed.), Lipsiae, T. G. Weigel, 1851.
Manuale legum sive Hexabiblos cum appendicibus et legibus agrariis, Gustav Ernst Heimbach (ed.), Lipsiae, T. G. Weigel, 1851.

1320 births
1385 deaths
14th-century Greek people
Byzantine jurists
Byzantine Thessalonian writers
14th-century jurists
14th-century Byzantine writers
14th-century Greek writers
14th-century Greek educators